Ensor is a crater on Mercury.  Its name was adopted by the International Astronomical Union (IAU) on 
December 16, 2013. Ensor is named for the Belgian painter James Ensor.

References

Impact craters on Mercury